The National Star Soccer League (NSSL) is officially affiliated to the United States Adult Soccer Association (USASA).

2010 Teams

North Central Conference 
JC United (Joplin, Missouri) 
KC Jaguars (Kansas City, Missouri) 
Midwest United (Storm Lake, Iowa) 
Omaha Red Fury (Omaha, Nebraska) 
Pumas (Emporia, Kansas) 
Real Des Moines (Des Moines, Iowa) 
Schuyler Warriors (Schuyler, Nebraska) 
Siouxland United (Sioux City, Iowa) 
Wichita Tornados (Wichita, Kansas)

Southwest Conference 
American Soccer Club (Clayton, California) 
California Dorados (Hayward, California) 
Centro Valley Eagles (Tracy, California) 
Combinados 2000 (Sacramento, California) 
El Samaritano (San Francisco, California) 
Kairos (Oakland, California) 
Napa Sport (Napa, California) 
Watsonville (Watsonville, California)

Northwest Conference 
Chelan Warriors (Chelan, Washington) 
Columbia River (Pasco, Washington) 
Estudiantes Tecos de Oregon (Portland, Oregon) 
Magic United (Boise, Idaho) 
Provo Premier (Provo, Utah) 
Shelton Timberland (Shelton, Washington) 
Yakima United (Yakima, Washington)

South Central Conference 
Brazos (Bryan, Texas) 
Brenham Lions (Brenham, Texas) 
Inter Tunell (Fort Worth, Texas) 
Houston Galaxticos (Houston, Texas) 
TSSA (Dallas, Texas)

2011 Teams 
The official website lists 25 new teams for the 2011 season.

External links 

NSSL Website

References 

United States Adult Soccer Association leagues
2010 establishments in the United States
Sports leagues established in 2010